Gilbert Delorme (born November 25, 1962, in Boucherville, Quebec) is a Canadian former professional ice hockey player who was a defenceman for five NHL teams. He played for the Montreal Canadiens, St. Louis Blues, Quebec Nordiques, Detroit Red Wings and Pittsburgh Penguins. Delorme was born in Boucherville, Quebec.

Delorme was selected by Montreal in the 1981 NHL Entry Draft in the first round (18th overall). He spent nine seasons in the NHL.

He missed the entire 1990–91 season recovering from broken leg suffered in an auto accident during training in the summer of 1990. Pittsburgh won the Cup in 1991, but Delorme was left off the cup for missing the whole season

Delorme retired following the 1991–92 season in the minors. He then briefly held a front office position with the Penguins before attempting a comeback in the IHL. He spent three seasons in the IHL as an assistant coach, split between the Cleveland Lumberjacks and Manitoba Moose. He also spent two seasons with the Montreal Rocket of the Quebec Major Junior Hockey League before serving as head coach for one season.

He and his wife now own a Tim Hortons franchise in Saint-Basile-le-Grand, Quebec, on Montreal's south shore.

Awards and achievements
QMJHL Second All-Star Team (1981)

Career statistics

Regular season and playoffs

International

External links

1962 births
Canadian ice hockey defencemen
Chicoutimi Saguenéens (QMJHL) players
Detroit Red Wings players
French Quebecers
Ice hockey people from Quebec
Kalamazoo Wings (1974–2000) players
Living people
Manitoba Moose coaches
Montreal Canadiens draft picks
Montreal Canadiens players
Montreal Roadrunners players
Montreal Rocket coaches
Muskegon Lumberjacks players
National Hockey League first-round draft picks
People from Boucherville
Pittsburgh Penguins players
Quebec Nordiques players
St. Louis Blues players
Canadian ice hockey coaches